Hisanori (written: 尚成, 尚徳, 永徳, 寿典 or 久則) is a masculine Japanese given name. Notable people with the name include:

 (1880–1970), Imperial Japanese Navy admiral
 (born 1978), Japanese actor
 (born 1964), Japanese footballer
 (born 1981), Japanese footballer
 (born 1975), Japanese baseball player

Japanese masculine given names